In the 2015–16 season, ASM Oran is competing in the Ligue 1 for the 31st season, as well as the Algerian Cup. They will be competing in Ligue 1, and the Algerian Cup.

Players

Transfers

In

Out

Non-competitive

Pre-season

Mid-season

Friendlies

Competitions

Overview

Ligue 1

League table

Results summary

Results by round

Matches

Algerian Cup

Squad information

Playing statistics

|-
! colspan=14 style=background:#dcdcdc; text-align:center| Goalkeepers

|-
! colspan=14 style=background:#dcdcdc; text-align:center| Defenders

|-
! colspan=14 style=background:#dcdcdc; text-align:center| Midfielders

|-
! colspan=14 style=background:#dcdcdc; text-align:center| Forwards

|-
! colspan=14 style=background:#dcdcdc; text-align:center| Players transferred out during the season

Goalscorers

References

ASM Oran seasons
Algerian football clubs 2015–16 season